Tony Lee Bradley Jr. (born January 8, 1998) is an American professional basketball player who last played for the Chicago Bulls of the National Basketball Association (NBA). He played college basketball for the University of North Carolina (UNC). A 6'10 center, Bradley was a primary substitute for the Tar Heels' 2017 NCAA championship team. He was selected by the Los Angeles Lakers with the 28th overall pick in the 2017 NBA draft, but traded to the Utah Jazz.

High school career
Born and raised in Bartow, Florida, Bradley played high school basketball for Bartow High School. He was named a McDonald's All-American in his senior year. Bradley chose North Carolina over Kansas, Florida, Florida State, Vanderbilt, Alabama, Miami and NC State. Bradley was rated as a five-star recruit and was ranked 17th in the ESPN 100 for the Class of 2016.

College career
In his freshman season, Bradley served as the primary substitute for senior Kennedy Meeks, averaging 7.5 points and 5.1 rebounds in 14.6 minutes per game and providing strong offensive rebounding for the Tar Heels.

Following the Tar Heels' championship win over Gonzaga, Bradley announced that he would declare his eligibility for the 2017 NBA draft without signing an agent, leaving open the opportunity to return to UNC for his sophomore season.  Bradley ultimately chose to remain in the NBA Draft, becoming the third "one-and-done" player during Williams' tenure at UNC and the second among those to have won a national championship.

Professional career

Utah Jazz (2017–2020) 
Bradley was selected 28th overall by the Los Angeles Lakers in the 2017 NBA Draft with his draft rights traded to the Utah Jazz. On July 5, 2017, Bradley signed with the Jazz. He made his NBA debut on November 5 against the Houston Rockets. He was assigned to the Jazz' G League affiliate, the Salt Lake City Stars on November 7, and made his G League debut the next night, scoring 20 points in a loss to the Wisconsin Herd.

Philadelphia 76ers (2020–2021) 
On November 22, 2020, Bradley and the draft rights to Saben Lee were traded to the Detroit Pistons in exchange for cash considerations. A day later, Bradley was traded to the Philadelphia 76ers in exchange for Zhaire Smith.

Oklahoma City Thunder (2021) 
On March 25, 2021, Bradley was traded to the Oklahoma City Thunder in a three-way trade involving the New York Knicks.

Chicago Bulls (2021–2023) 
On August 19, 2021, Bradley signed with the Chicago Bulls.

On February 21, 2023, Bradley was waived by the Bulls.

Career statistics

NBA

Regular season

|-
| style="text-align:left;"| 
| style="text-align:left;"| Utah
| 9 || 0 || 3.2 || .273 || .000 || 1.000 || 1.2 || .1 || .0 || .0 || .9
|-
| style="text-align:left;"| 
| style="text-align:left;"| Utah
| 3 || 0 || 12.0 || .500 || — || .500 || 5.0 || .3 || .7 || .7 || 5.7
|-
| style="text-align:left;"| 
| style="text-align:left;"| Utah
| 58 || 3 || 11.4 || .667 || 1.000 || .652 || 4.6 || .4 || .2 || .6 || 4.9
|-
| style="text-align:left;" rowspan=2| 
| style="text-align:left;"| Philadelphia
| 20 || 8 || 14.4 || .680 || .000 || .636 || 5.2 || .9 || .3 || .7 || 5.5
|-
| style="text-align:left;"| Oklahoma City
| 22 || 0 || 18.0 || .656 || .000 || .705 || 6.1 || .9 || .4 || .8 || 8.7
|-
| style="text-align:left;"| 
| style="text-align:left;"| Chicago
| 55 || 7 || 10.0 || .585 || — || .655 || 3.4 || .5 || .2 || .6 || 3.0
|-
| style="text-align:left;"| 
| style="text-align:left;"| Chicago
| 12 || 0 || 2.8 || .500 || .600 || 1.000 || .9 || .1 || .1 || .1 || 1.6
|- class="sortbottom"
| style="text-align:center;" colspan="2"| Career
| 179 || 18 || 11.1 || .631 || .500 || .681 || 4.1 || .5 || .2 || .6 || 4.4

Playoffs

|-
| style="text-align:left;"| 2018
| style="text-align:left;"| Utah
| 1 || 0 || 2.0 || .500 || — || — || 1.0 || .0 || .0 || .0 || 2.0
|-
| style="text-align:left;"| 2020
| style="text-align:left;"| Utah
| 6 || 0 || 8.1 || .222 || — || .714 || 3.8 || .2 || .3 || .3 || 1.5
|-
| style="text-align:left;"| 2022
| style="text-align:left;"| Chicago
| 2 || 0 || 4.0 || 1.000 || — || — || 2.0 || .5 || .0 || .0 || 5.0
|- class="sortbottom"
| style="text-align:center;" colspan="2"| Career
| 9 || 0 || 6.4 || .500 || — || .714 || 3.1 || .2 || .2 || .2 || 2.3

College

|-
| style="text-align:left;"| 2016–17
| style="text-align:left;"| North Carolina
| 38 || 0 || 14.6 || .573 || – || .619 || 5.1 || .6 || .3 || .6 || 7.1

References

External links
North Carolina Tar Heels bio

1998 births
Living people
21st-century African-American sportspeople
African-American basketball players
American men's basketball players
Basketball players from Florida
Centers (basketball)
Chicago Bulls players
Los Angeles Lakers draft picks
McDonald's High School All-Americans
North Carolina Tar Heels men's basketball players
Oklahoma City Thunder players
Philadelphia 76ers players
Power forwards (basketball)
Salt Lake City Stars players
Sportspeople from Bartow, Florida
Utah Jazz players